The Purple Rain refers to at least two popular mixed drinks. The more common is a variation on the highball Long Island Iced Tea, substituting Chambord for Triple Sec and a lemon-lime soda for the cola. The other is a long cocktail made from vodka, lemonade, blue Curaçao and grenadine. The name of this version originates from the appearance of the drink as the grenadine is added as the final ingredient, since the sinking of the red grenadine through the blue of the other ingredients creates the impression of purple rain. This drink has many versions depending on where it is made.

Grape juice variants
One variant uses vodka, orange liqueur, blue curacao, lime juice, pineapple juice, and concord grape juice. Another uses Greenbar Tru Lemon Vodka, Licor, lemon juice, and grape juice.

References 

Cocktails with vodka